Song Jun-gil (Hangul: 송준길, Hanja: 宋浚吉; 28 December 1606 – 2 December 1672), also known by his pen name Dongchundang, was a Korean politician and Neo-Confucian scholar, who lived during the Joseon Dynasty.

Born in Okcheon, North Chungcheong Province, he was the best friend and a distant relative of Song Si-yeol. His daughter, Lady Song, was the mother of Queen Inhyeon, who would become the second wife of King Sukjong.

Relations with the Royal Family 
Song Jun-gil's descendants through his second daughter had made him the maternal grandfather of Min Jin-hu, Min Jin-won, and Queen Inhyeon. He eventually became the 5th great-grandfather of Empress Myeongseong and the 6th great-grandfather of Empress Sunmyeong. 

When Empress Myeongseong became Queen, she also close connections to the families of her 5th maternal great-grandmother (Eunjin Song clan), and 4th maternal great-grandmother (Jinju Jeong clan).

Family 
 Great-grandfather
 Song Se-yeong (송세영, 宋世英)
 Grandfather
 Song Eung-seo (송응서, 宋應瑞) (1530 – 1608)
 Grandmother
 Lady Yi of the Gwangju Yi clan (광주 이씨)
 Father
 Song Yi-chang (송이창, 宋爾昌) (1561 – May 1627)
 Mother
 Lady Kim of the Gwangsan Kim clan (광산 김씨, 光山 金氏) (? – 1621)
 Wives and their issue
 Lady Kim (김씨, 金氏) — no issue.
 Lady Jeong of the Jinju Jeong clan (진주 정씨, 晋州 鄭氏) (1604 – 1655)
 Son: Song Gwang-sik (송광식, 宋光栻) (1625 – 1664)
 Granddaughter: Lady Song of the Eunjin Song clan (은진 송씨, 恩津 宋氏)
 Grandson-in-law: Won Mong-ik of the Wonju Won clan (원몽익 원주 원씨, 元夢翼 原州 元氏)
 Great-grandson: Won Myeong-gu (원명구, 元命龜) 
 Grandson: Song Byeong-mun (송병문)
 Grandson: Song Byeong-ha (송병하)
 Grandson: Song Byeong-won (송병원)
Grandson: Song Byeong-ik (송병익)
 Daughter: Lady Song of the Eunjin Song clan (은진 송씨, 恩津 宋氏)
 Son-in-law: Na Myeong-jwa of the Anjeong Na clan (나명좌 안정 나씨)
 Daughter: Internal Princess Consort Eunseong of the Eunjin Song clan (은성부부인 은진송씨, 恩城府夫人 恩津 宋氏) (1637 – 1672) 
 Son-in-law: Min Yu-jung (민유중, 閔維重) (1630 – 29 June 1687) 
 Granddaughter: Lady Min of the Yeoheung Min clan (1656 – 1728) (여흥 민씨, 驪興 閔氏)
 Grandson: Min Jin-hu (1659 – 1720) (민진후, 閔鎭厚)
 Grandson: Min Jin-won (1664 – 1736) (민진원, 閔鎭遠)
 Granddaughter: Queen Inhyeon of the Yeoheung Min clan (인현왕후 민씨, 仁顯王后 閔氏) (15 May 1667 – 16 September 1701)
 Granddaughter: Lady Min of the Yeoheung Min clan (여흥 민씨, 驪興 閔氏)
 Granddaughter: Min Jeong-seong, Lady Min of the Yeoheung Min clan (민정성 여흥 민씨) (1672 – 1672)
 Granddaughter: Min Jeong-je, Lady Min of the Yeoheung Min clan (민정제 여흥 민씨) (1672 – ?)
 Concubines and their issue
 Yi Rang, Lady Yi (이랑 이씨, 李娘 李氏) — no issue
 Lady Min of the Yeoheung Min clan (여흥 민씨, 驪興 閔氏) (1640 – 1712)
 Son: Song Gwang-rim (송광림)
 Son: Song Gwang-cheon (송광천)
 Son: Song Gwang-yeong (송광영)

Works
 Eorokhae (어록해, 語錄解)
 Dongchundangjip (동춘당집)

See also 
 Kim Man-jung
 Kim Jip
 Kim Yuk
 Gwon Sang-ha
 Heo Mok
 Yun Hyu
 Yun Seon-do
 Hong U-won

References

Site web 
 Song Jungil:Naver 
 Song Jungil 
 Song Jungil:Korean historical people information 

1606 births
1672 deaths
17th-century Korean writers
Joseon scholar-officials
Korean scholars
Korean Confucianists
17th-century Korean philosophers
Eunjin Song clan